Arnold is a computer program for rendering three-dimensional, computer-generated scenes using unbiased, physically-based, Monte Carlo path tracing techniques. Created in Spain by Marcos Fajardo and later co-developed by his company Solid Angle SL (now owned by Autodesk) and Sony Pictures Imageworks, Arnold is one of the most widely used photorealistic rendering systems in computer graphics worldwide in 2021, specially in animation and VFX for film and TV.
Notable feature films that have used Arnold include Monster House, Cloudy with a Chance of Meatballs, Alice in Wonderland, Thor, Captain America, X-Men: First Class, The Avengers, Space Pirate Captain Harlock, Elysium, Pacific Rim, Gravity, Guardians of the Galaxy, Star Wars: The Force Awakens, Arrival and Blade Runner 2049. Notable television series include Game of Thrones, Westworld, Trollhunters, LOVE DEATH + ROBOTS and The Mandalorian.

Technology
Originally written in C99 and progressively rewritten in C++, Arnold runs natively on x86 CPUs, where it tries to take advantage of all available threads and SIMD lanes for optimal parallelism.  Since March 2019 it supports Nvidia RTX-powered GPUs through the use of OptiX.  Its ray tracing engine is optimized to send billions of spatially incoherent rays throughout a 3D scene composed of geometric primitives including polygons, hair splines, and volumes.  It often uses multiple levels of diffuse and specular inter-reflection so that light can bounce off of a wall or other object and indirectly illuminate a subject.  For complex scenes such as the space station in Elysium, it makes heavy use of geometry instancing, which helps it render trillions of visible polygons in a reasonable amount of memory.  It can render large numbers of high-resolution texture maps thanks to its integration of the OpenImageIO library.  It has a fully programmable API, and uses shaders written in C++ or Open Shading Language to define the materials and textures.

Arnold is based on the Monte Carlo Path Tracing algorithm, making extensive use of importance sampling and other numerical techniques to improve the quality of rendered images.  Throughout the 2010s, its team published research that popularized the use of solid angle-based sampling of area lights in production rendering, equi-angular sampling for volumetric scattering, ray-traced sub-surface scattering, and blue-noise dithered sampling.

History

Marcos Fajardo is the chief architect of Arnold. The beginnings of what is now Arnold emerged in 1997 when Fajardo decided to write his own renderer. That year, he attended SIGGRAPH, where his interest in stochastic ray tracing (a foundational part of Arnold's rendering technology) was piqued in discussions with friends attending the conference.

Early versions of Fajardo's renderer were called RenderAPI. The name Arnold emerged when one of Fajardo's friends suggested it after mocking an Arnold Schwarzenegger film they saw in a theater.

In 2004, Fajardo entered a licensing and co-development agreement with Sony Pictures Imageworks, which resulted in separate branches for the commercial and proprietary versions of Arnold. The commercial version was integrated via plug-ins into several DCC packages including Softimage, Maya, Katana, Cinema4D, and Houdini.

Solid Angle SL, the company behind Arnold, was founded in 2009 in Madrid and purchased by Autodesk in early 2016. The acquisition was announced officially on April 18, 2016. Arnold is now bundled with Maya and 3ds Max.

On 4 January 2017, the Academy of Motion Picture Arts and Sciences recognized Fajardo with a Scientific and Engineering award (Academy plaque) for "the creative vision and original implementation of the Arnold Renderer."

On 21 October 2021, the Television Academy recognized Fajardo, along with colleagues Alan King and Thiago Ize, with an Engineering Emmy statuette for the Arnold Global Illumination Rendering System.

Notable studios using Arnold

See also
 Pixar RenderMan
 Vray

References

External links
 
 Autodesk product page

3D graphics software
Rendering systems
Global illumination software
3D computer graphics software for Linux
Proprietary commercial software for Linux
3D rendering software for Linux